As part of the British honours system, Special Honours are issued at the Monarch's pleasure at any given time. The Special Honours refer to the awards made within royal prerogative, operational honours, political honours and other honours awarded outside the New Years Honours and Birthday Honours.

Peerages 

 His Royal Highness The Duke of Cornwall, Rothesay and Cambridge,  the additional titles Prince of Wales and Earl of Chester – 13 February 2023
 His Royal Highness The Earl of Wessex and Forfar,  the additional title Duke of Edinburgh – 9 March 2023

Lord Lieutenant 

 Ian Crowe,  – to be Lord-Lieutenant of the County Borough of Londonderry – 12 January 2023

Privy Counsellor 

 Maria Eagle  – 15 February 2023.
 Marcus Jones  – 22 February 2023.
 Craig Whittaker  – 22 February 2023.
 Kelly Tolhurst  – 22 February 2023.

Most Distinguished Order of St Michael and St George

Dame Grand Cross of the Order of St Michael and St George (GCMG) 
 Her Excellency Marcella Liburd,  – On her appointment as Governor-General of Saint Kitts and Nevis – 5 February 2023

Most Excellent Order of the British Empire

Knight / Dame Commander of the Order of the British Empire (KBE / DBE) 
Civil division
Angela Ahrendts,  – 18 January 2023 – Honorary appointed in 2013 to be made Substantive
Professor Adrian Hill,  – 18 January 2023 – Honorary appointed in 2021 to be made Substantive

Commander of the Order of the British Empire (CBE) 
Civil division
Bryn St. Pierre Parry – For services to members of the Armed Forces, Veterans and their Families – 8 February 2023

King's Gallantry Medal (KGM) 

For intervening in an armed attack on 5th May 2020.
 Lisa Way
 Ayette Bounouri 
 John Rees (posthumous)

For their actions during the terrorist attack at the Learning Together event in Fishmongers’ Hall, London on 29th November 2019.
 Steven Gallant
 John Crilly
 Darryn Frost
 Lukasz Koczocik

Imperial Service Medal (ISM) 

Michael James Andrews, Field Interviewer, Office for National Statistics – 4 January 2023
Ms. Victoria Louise Rushton, Ministry of Defence – 24 January 2023
Mrs. Victoria Jayne Howard, Ministry of Defence – 24 January 2023
Mrs. Wendy Margaret Cracroft, Ministry of Defence – 7 February 2023

King's Commendation for Bravery 

For his actions during the terrorist attack at the Learning Together event in Fishmongers’ Hall, London on 29th November 2019.
 Adam Roberts

For rescuing the occupants of a vehicle that crashed and caught fire on the A38 on 21st June 2021.
 Ed Durante
 Craig Jones

For rescuing her neighbour from a house fire on 28th January 2020.
 Bardha Kola

For rescuing a distressed man from the River Irwell on 17th February 2018.
 PC Mohammed Nadeem

For rescuing a woman from a fatal house fire on 1st January 2019.
 Kenneth Wood
 Rafal Majchrzak

For rescuing a motorist from their vehicle following a head on collision on 11th May 2019.
 Andrew Lax

Order of St John

Dame Grand Cross of the Order of St John (GCStJ) 
Ann Elizabeth Cable,  – 7 February 2023

Commander of the Order of St John (CStJ) 
John Andrew Armitt – 7 February 2023
Dr Cheryle June Berry,  – 7 February 2023
Reverend Stephen Alastair Blakey – 7 February 2023
Dr Dale Cartwright, JP – 7 February 2023
Lieutenant General Richard John Cripwell,  – 7 February 2023
Michael Robert Crosbie – 7 February 2023
David Miles Davies – 7 February 2023
Meryl Catherine Dean – 7 February 2023
The Reverend Neil Norman Gardner – 7 February 2023
The Right Reverend Bishop Andrew William Lindsay Hedge – 7 February 2023
Georgina Alice Holloway – 7 February 2023
Sir John Wilfred Peace,  – 7 February 2023
Professor Sir Keith MacDonald Porter – 7 February 2023
Simon Aeneas Mackintosh – 7 February 2023
Dorothy Noelene Marks – 7 February 2023
William Ramsay McGhee – 7 February 2023
Professor Paul Mealor – 7 February 2023
Christopher George Reynolds – 7 February 2023
Susan Jean Sheldon, JP – 7 February 2023
Andrew Ian Smith – 7 February 2023
Diane Margaret Smith – 7 February 2023
Agnes Gray Taylor – 7 February 2023
Peter Gerard Tranter – 7 February 2023
Sheriff George Alexander Way of Plean – 7 February 2023
The Reverend Louis Zampese – 7 February 2023

Officer of the Order of St John (OStJ) 
- appointments 7 February 2023

Member of the Order of St John (MStJ) 
- appointments 7 February 2023

References 

2023 awards in the United Kingdom
New Zealand awards
2023 awards in Canada
British honours system